Reynosa is a municipality located in the Mexican state of Tamaulipas. It includes the city of Reynosa. In population, both the municipality and the city (locality) are the largest in their respective categories in the state of Tamaulipas.

Towns and villages

The largest localities (cities, towns, and villages) are:

Adjacent municipalities and counties

 Río Bravo Municipality - east
 Méndez Municipality - south
 China Municipality, Nuevo León - southwest
 General Bravo Municipality, Nuevo León - west
 Gustavo Díaz Ordaz Municipality - west, northwest
 Hidalgo County, Texas - north

References

External links
 Gobierno Municipal de Reynosa Official website

 
Municipalities of Tamaulipas
Lower Rio Grande Valley